Jesmond Vale is an area in the Ouseburn Valley, Newcastle upon Tyne, England that has a rich history with industrial archaeology, mature trees, and a variety of wildlife. It is a popular open space for recreation and for walkers.

Geography 
The area includes Armstrong Park, Heaton Park and Ouseburn Park. It has other recreational green areas, housing, allotment gardens and a pub. It also includes a street named 'Jesmond Vale'. The locality is a mainly wooded and grassed area between The Cradlewell and Armstrong Bridge to the north and Burnville (left side) Stratford Road (right side) leading to Stratford Grove to the south. The Ouseburn flows through it and eventually into the River Tyne. It is mostly administered by the city council ward of South Jesmond. The Ouseburn flows from the north, through Jesmond Dene, then underneath the historic Armstrong Bridge where it enters Jesmond Vale. After this trip, it runs between some allotment gardens alongside the lower edges of Armstrong Park and Heaton Park, flowing over a weir at the white bridge near Greenwater Pool. It then flows near The Bluebell pub, and on through Ouseburn Park, past the Newcastle music resource centre. It goes under another stone bridge, then it enters a culvert in Ouseburn Park where Jesmond Vale ends and the Lower Ouseburn Valley starts.

History 

The use of Jesmond Vale changed from farming to industry to leisure and housing with an extensive slum demolition in the 1960s. The vale is now mostly given over to parks, allotments and routes used by recreational walkers.

Lost village

The old village of Jesmond Vale used to sit amongst fields in the bottom of the Ouseburn Valley, a tranquil haven away from the bustle of the city. The village had three pubs, a farm and a mill beside the river. The remains of the mill can still be seen, and the leat which fed it can be traced back to the mill dam at Greenwater Pool. Originally a corn mill, it was later adapted to grind flint for use as glaze in the pottery industry. Flint was brought into the Tyne as ballast on cargo ships and was then carted up to the mills on the Ouseburn.

The bulk of the old village was demolished in the 1960s when the Vale was earmarked for redevelopment. Of the three pubs only the Bluebell Inn survives. Much of the housing was replaced in the 1960s by Vale House, a residential tower block of 28 storeys and still the second tallest building in Newcastle upon Tyne.

Cradlewell bypass 
In the 1990s an ambitious road project bypassed the Cradlewell area of Jesmond replacing the steep gradients of Benton Bank and joining Jesmond Road with the Coast Road. In order to build it several ancient trees were cut down at the northern end of Jesmond Vale. Environmentalist protesters were drawn from all over the country and they delayed construction by constructing tree houses and camping in the tree-tops.

Prior to construction a large concrete pillar was built at Benton Bank as a test pillar. Even though it was no longer needed it remained there for some 20 years before it was finally removed.

References 

Districts of Newcastle upon Tyne